Tidy may refer to:

HTML Tidy, a computer program for fixing HTML errors
PerlTidy, a computer program for nicely reformatting Perl source code
Tidy (album), a 1996 album by Kinnie Starr
Tidy (surname)
TIDY, software for managing property services
Tidying, an aspect of housekeeping

See also